Nebraska's 3rd congressional district is a congressional district in the U.S. state of Nebraska that encompasses its western three-fourths; it is one of the largest non-at-large districts in the country, covering nearly , two time zones and 68 counties. It includes Grand Island, Kearney, Hastings, North Platte, Alliance, and Scottsbluff. Additionally, it encompasses the Sandhills region and a large majority of the Platte River.

Nebraska has had at least three congressional districts since 1883. The district's current configuration dates from 1963, when Nebraska lost a seat as a result of the 1960 United States Census. At that time, most of the old 3rd and 4th districts were merged to form the new 3rd district. It is one of the most Republican districts in the nation, as Democrats have only come close to winning it three times as currently drawn, in 1974, 1990, and 2006, all years where the incumbent was not running for reelection. Republican presidential and gubernatorial candidates routinely carry the district with margins of 40 percent or more, while Franklin D. Roosevelt in 1936 was the last Democratic presidential candidate to win a plurality within the current district boundaries.

Excepting historically Democratic Saline County on the district's eastern boundary and Dakota County which has only been within the district since 2013, the last Democrat to carry any county within the district at a presidential level was Jimmy Carter in 1976. Although the Nebraska Legislature is elected on a nonpartisan basis, all but two members representing significant portions of the district are known to be Republicans. With a Cook Partisan Voting Index (CPVI) of R+30, it is the most Republican congressional district outside the Southern United States. Because Nebraska awards an Electoral College vote from each district, it is the most Republican Electoral College constituency. It is currently held by Republican Adrian Smith, who was first elected in 2006.

Recent results in statewide races

List of members representing the district

Election history

2004

2006

2008

2010

2012

2014

2016

2018

2020

2022

Historical district boundaries

See also

Nebraska's congressional districts
List of United States congressional districts

References

 Congressional Biographical Directory of the United States 1774–present

03
1883 establishments in Nebraska